"Carry On" is a song by Avenged Sevenfold. The song was released on iTunes on September 24, 2012.

Music style and lyrical themes
The song is a fast, uptempo song inspired by a "classic metal" sound.

In an interview with the band's lead singer M. Shadows about the song's meaning he said,

In popular culture
The song plays after the end credits of Call of Duty: Black Ops II in a non-canon music video, showing the band as well as two characters from the game, Raul Menendez (voiced by Kamar de los Reyes) on guitar (guitar played by 'Scarlett') and Sergeant Frank Woods (voiced by James C. Burns) on drums, as the song plays a montage of cutscenes and gameplay elements. It is also used in the reveal trailer for the game's Zombies mode.

Record Store Day release
For Record Store Day 2013, the band released the song on a 12" picture disc. The A-side has the album artwork, while the B-side has the band's Deathbat logo in black on a white background.. The numbers '75' and '60' are written above the wings.

Chart performance

Personnel
Avenged Sevenfold
 M. Shadows – lead vocals
 Zacky Vengeance – rhythm guitar, backing vocals
 Synyster Gates – lead guitar, backing vocals
 Johnny Christ – bass, backing vocals (live)
Additional musician
 Arin Ilejay – drums

References

External links
Official music video

2012 singles
Avenged Sevenfold songs
Video game theme songs
2012 songs
Warner Records singles